The Eastern League Most Valuable Player Award (MVP) is an annual award given to the best player in Minor League Baseball's Eastern League based on their regular-season performance as voted on by league managers. League broadcasters, Minor League Baseball executives, and members of the media have previously voted as well. Though the league was established in 1938, the award was not created until 1962. After the cancellation of the 2020 season, the league was known as the Double-A Northeast in 2021 before reverting to the Eastern League name in 2022.

Twenty-two outfielders have won the MVP Award, the most of any position. First basemen, with 18 winners, have won the most among infielders, followed by third basemen (8), second basemen (3), and shortstops (1). Five catchers and three pitchers have also won the award.

Eleven players who have won the MVP Award have also won the Eastern League Top MLB Prospect Award (formerly the Rookie of the Year Award) in the same season: Cliff Floyd (1993), Mark Grudzielanek (1994), Jay Payton (1995), Vladimir Guerrero (1996), Calvin Pickering (1998), Marlon Byrd (2001), Ryan Howard (2004), Jordan Brown (2007), Brandon Laird (2010), Darin Ruf (2012), and Cavan Biggio (2018). From 1964 to 1984, pitchers were eligible to win the MVP Award as no award was designated for pitchers. In 1985, the Eastern League established a Pitcher of the Year Award.

Eight players from the Reading Fightin Phils have been selected for the MVP Award, more than any other team in the league, followed by the Harrisburg Senators (6); the Akron RubberDucks, Binghamton Rumble Ponies, Bowie Baysox, Glens Falls Tigers, and New Hampshire Fisher Cats (3); the Elmira Pioneers, Erie SeaWolves, Pittsfield Cubs, Pittsfield Red Sox, Trenton Thunder, Trois-Rivières Aigles, and West Haven A's (2); and the Albany-Colonie Yankees, Altoona Curve, Berkshire Brewers, Buffalo Bisons, Charleston Indians, Holyoke Millers, New Britain Red Sox, New Haven Ravens, Pittsfield Rangers, Portland Sea Dogs, Sherbrooke Pirates, Somerset Patriots, Springfield Giants, Thetford Mines Pirates, Waterbury Indians, Williamsport Mets, and York Pirates (1).

Eight players from the Philadelphia Phillies Major League Baseball (MLB) organization have won the award, more than any other, followed by the Pittsburgh Pirates organization (6); the Baltimore Orioles, Cleveland Guardians, New York Yankees, and Washington Nationals organizations (5); the New York Mets and Toronto Blue Jays organizations (4); the Boston Red Sox and Detroit Tigers organizations (3); the Chicago Cubs, Chicago White Sox, Cincinnati Reds, and Milwaukee Brewers organizations (2); and the Miami Marlins, Oakland Athletics, San Francisco Giants, and Texas Rangers organizations (1).

Winners

Wins by team

Active Eastern League teams appear in bold.

Wins by organization

Active Eastern League–Major League Baseball affiliations appear in bold.

References
Specific

General

Awards established in 1962
MVP
Minor league baseball trophies and awards
Minor league baseball MVP award winners